Shaken 'n' Stirred is the third solo studio album by English singer Robert Plant, released on 20 May 1985 by Es Paranza, his own label. Plant, Benji Le Fevre, and Tim Palmer produced the album. Shaken 'n' Stirred peaked at No. 19 on the UK Albums Chart and at No. 20 on the US Billboard 200.

The album featured his second Mainstream Rock Tracks top hit, "Little by Little", which was No. 1 on the chart for two weeks. "Sixes and Sevens" also charted on that chart, peaking at No. 18.

Rhino Entertainment released a remastered edition of the album, with one bonus track, on 20 March 2007.

On his podcast, Digging Deep, Plant remembers "Too Loud" as one song that was misunderstood. "I got some of Bette Midler’s girls to help me with some choruses and stuff," he says. "I basically was seriously affected by David Byrne [of Talking Heads]. It’s very funny, it’s a funny song, it’s supposed to be funny."

Track listing

Personnel
Musicians
 Robert Plant – vocals
 Robbie Blunt – guitar, guitar synthesizer
 Paul Martinez – bass guitar, guitar
 Jezz Woodroffe – keyboards
 Richie Hayward – drums
 Toni Halliday – additional vocals

Technical personnel
 Robert Plant – producer
 Benji LeFevre – producer, engineer
 Tim Palmer – producer, engineer

Charts

References

External links
 

1985 albums
Robert Plant albums
Albums produced by Tim Palmer